KIMS Hospital is the largest independent private hospital in Kent. It is situated in Maidstone and treats privately insured, self-funding and NHS patients. It is situated on the Kent Medical Campus, off Junction 7 of the M20 Motorway.  LycaHealth, which owns medical centres in Orpington and Canary Wharf, become its majority shareholder in October 2021.

History 
The hospital, which was designed by David Morley Architects and built by Vinci Construction, opened in 2014.

Facilities 
KIMS Hospital's primary specialties are orthopedic surgery, cardiology, gynecology, breast surgery and general surgery.

Awards 
In November 2015, the Interventional Cardiology team at KIMS Hospital won the LaingBuisson Nursing Practice Award.

In November 2016, KIMS Hospital received an "Excellence Award" for the importance it places on the health and well-being of their staff. The Kent Healthy Business Awards was part of a national initiative funded by Public Health England and driven locally by Maidstone Borough Council and Kent County Council.

References

Health in Kent
Private providers of NHS services
Hospitals in Kent
Private hospitals in the United Kingdom
Buildings and structures in Maidstone